Ángel Villar Varela (born 16 September 1949) is a Spanish sprint canoeist who competed in the late 1960s. He was eliminated in the repechages of the K-4 1000 m event at the 1968 Summer Olympics in Mexico City.

References

1946 births
Canoeists at the 1968 Summer Olympics
Living people
Olympic canoeists of Spain
Spanish male canoeists
Place of birth missing (living people)
20th-century Spanish people